Matija Ljujić (born 28 October 1993) is a Serbian professional footballer who plays as an attacking midfielder for Azerbaijani club Sabail on loan from the Hungarian side Újpest.

Career

Early career
Ljujic is a product of the FK Partizan academy.

FK Rad 
Ljujić played for Rad in the Serbian SuperLiga in 2015–16 season.

FK Žalgiris 
On 15 June 2016 he signed for Lithuanian champions Žalgiris.

Wellington Phoenix 
On 9 January 2018, Ljujić signed for Wellington Phoenix until the end of their 2017–18 season. He scored his first goal for the club in his debut home game against Western Sydney Wanderers, a long-range dipping strike that beat Vedran Janjetović in goal.

Belenenses
On 1 June 2018, Ljujić joined Belenenses on a three-year contract.

Bnei Yehuda
On 18 September 2019 Ljujić signed the Israeli Premier League club from the city Tel Aviv Bnei Yehuda.

Gangwon FC
On 20 July 2021 Ljujić joined the K League 1 club Gangwon FC.

Hapoel Haifa
On 26 January 2022, he joined the Israeli Premier League club Hapoel Haifa.

Personal life

His father, Sinisa "Maca" Ljujic, is a football coach.

References

External links
 
 Matija Ljujić stats at utakmica.rs 
 

1993 births
People from Prijepolje
Living people
Association football midfielders
Serbian footballers
FK Teleoptik players
FK Mladost Lučani players
FK Rad players
FK Žalgiris players
Wellington Phoenix FC players
Belenenses SAD players
Bnei Yehuda Tel Aviv F.C. players
Gangwon FC players
Hapoel Haifa F.C. players
Újpest FC players
Sabail FK players
Serbian First League players
Serbian SuperLiga players
A Lyga players
A-League Men players
Primeira Liga players
Israeli Premier League players
K League 1 players
Nemzeti Bajnokság I players
Azerbaijan Premier League players
Serbian expatriate footballers
Expatriate footballers in Lithuania
Serbian expatriate sportspeople in Lithuania
Expatriate soccer players in Australia
Serbian expatriate sportspeople in Australia
Expatriate footballers in Portugal
Serbian expatriate sportspeople in Portugal
Expatriate footballers in Israel
Serbian expatriate sportspeople in Israel
Expatriate footballers in South Korea
Serbian expatriate sportspeople in South Korea
Expatriate footballers in Hungary
Serbian expatriate sportspeople in Hungary
Expatriate footballers in Azerbaijan
Serbian expatriate sportspeople in Azerbaijan